VOC opperhoofden in Japan were the chief traders of the Dutch East India Company (Vereenigde Oostindische Compagnie or VOC in old-spelling Dutch, literally "United East Indian Company") in Japan during the period of the Tokugawa shogunate, also known as the Edo period.

Opperhoofd is a Dutch word (plural opperhoofden) which literally means 'supreme head[man]'. In its historical usage, the word is a gubernatorial title, comparable to the English chief factor, for the chief executive officer of a Dutch factory in the sense of trading post, as led by a factor, i.e. agent. The Japanese called the Dutch chief factors kapitan (from Portuguese capitão).

The Dutch East India Company was established in 1602 by the States-General of the Netherlands to carry out colonial activities in Asia. The VOC enjoyed unique success in Japan, in part because of the ways in which the character and other qualities of its Opperhoofden were perceived to differ from other competitors.

Trading posts or factories

Hirado, 1609–1639

The first VOC trading outpost in Japan was on the island of Hirado off the coast of Kyūshū. Permission for establishing this permanent facility was granted in 1609 by the first Tokugawa-shōgun Ieyasu; but the right to make use of this convenient location was revoked in 1639.

Dejima, 1639–1860

In 1638, the harsh Sakoku ("closed door" policy) was ordered by the Tokugawa shogunate; and by 1641, the VOC had to transfer all of its mercantile operations to the small man-made island of Dejima in Nagasaki harbor. The island had been built for the Portuguese, but they had been forced to abandon it and all contacts with Japan. Only the Dutch were permitted to remain after all other Westerners had been excluded.

The Dutch presence in Japan was closely monitored and controlled. For example, each year the VOC had to transfer the opperhoofd. Each opperhoofd was expected to travel to Edo to offer tribute to the shogun (Dutch missions to Edo). The VOC traders had to be careful not to import anything religious; and they were not allowed to bring any women, nor to bury their dead ashore. They were largely free to do as they pleased on the island; but they were explicitly ordered to work on Sunday.

For nearly 200 years a series of VOC traders lived, worked and seemed to thrive in this confined location.

In 1799 the VOC went bankrupt. The trade with Japan was continued by the Dutch Indian government at Batavia, with an interruption during the English occupation of Java, during which the English (Stamford Raffles) unsuccessfully tried to capture Dejima.
After the creation of the Kingdom of The Netherlands (1815) the trade with Japan came under the administration of the Minister of the Colonies by way of the Governor General in Batavia. The directors of the trade (Opperhoofd) became colonial civil servants. From 1855 the director of the trade with Japan, Janus Henricus Donker Curtius, became 'Dutch Commissioner in Japan' with orders to conclude a treaty with Japan. He succeeded in 1855 to conclude a convention, changed into a treaty in January 1856. In 1857 he concluded a commercial paragraph in addition to the treaty of 1856, thus concluding the first western treaty of friendship and commerce with Japan. His successor, Jan Karel de Wit was Dutch Consul General in Japan, though still a colonial civil servant. In 1862 the Dutch representation in Japan was transferred to the Ministry for Foreign Affairs. This change was effected in Japan in 1863, Dirk de Graeff van Polsbroek becoming Consul General and Political Agent in Japan.

List of chief traders at Hirado 
Hirado is a small island just off the western shore of the Japanese island of Kyūshū. In the early 17th century, Hirado was a major center of foreign trade and included British, Chinese, and other trading stations along with the Dutch one, maintained and operated by the Dutch East India Company (VOC) after 1609. The serial leaders of this VOC trading enclave or factory at Hirado were:

 Jacques Specx, 20 September 1609 – 28 August 1612
 Hendrick Brouwer, 28 August 1612 – 6 August 1614
 Jacques Specx, 6 August 1614 – 29 October 1621
 Leonardt Camps, 29 October 1621 – 21 November 1623
 Cornelis van Nijenrode, 21 November 1623 – 1631
 Pieter Stamper, 1631
 Cornelis van Nijenrode, 1631 – 31 January 1633
 Pieter van Sante, 31 January 1633 – 6 September 1633
 Nicolaes Couckebacker, 6 September 1633 – 1635
 Maerten Wesselingh (or Hendrick Hagenaer), 1635–1637
 Nicolaes Couckebacker, 1637 – 3 February 1639
 François Caron, 3 February 1639 – 13 February 1641

List of chief traders at Dejima

 was a fan-shaped artificial island in the bay of Nagasaki. This island was a Dutch trading post during Japan's period of maritime restrictions (海禁, kaikin, 1641–1853) during the Edo period. The serial leaders of this VOC trading enclave or "factory" at Dejima were:

Maximiliaen Le Maire: 14 February 1641 – 30 October 1641 Le Maire was the first "new" chief trader at Dejima
Jan van Elseracq: 1 November 1641 – 29 October 1642
Pieter Anthoniszoon Overtwater: 29 October 1642 – 1 August 1643
Jan van Elseracq: 1 August 1643 – 24 November 1644
Pieter Anthonijszoon Overtwater: 24 November 1644 – 30 November 1645
Renier van Tzum: 30 November 1645 – 27 October 1646
Willem Verstegen [Versteijen]: 28 October 1646 – 10 October 1647
Frederick Coyett: 3 November 1647 – 9 December 1648
Dircq Snoecq: 9 December 1648 – 5 November 1649
Anthonio van Brouckhorst: 5 November 1649 – 25 October 1650
Pieter Sterthemius: 25 October 1650 – 3 November 1651
Adriaen van der Burgh: 1 November 1651 – 3 November 1652
Frederick Coyett: 4 November 1652 – 10 November 1653
Gabriel Happart: 4 November 1653 – 31 October 1654
Leonard Winninx: 31 October 1654 – 23 October 1655
Joan Boucheljon: 23 October 1655 – 1 November 1656
Zacharias Wagenaer [Wagener]: 1 November 1656 – 27 October 1657
Joan Boucheljon: 27 October 1657 – 23 October 1658
Zacharias Wagenaer [Wagener]: 22 October 1658 – 4 November 1659
Joan Boucheljon: 4 November 1659 – 26 October 1660
Hendrick Indijck: 26 October 1660 – 21 November 1661
Dirck van Lier: 11 November 1661 – 6 November 1662
Hendrick Indijck: 6 November 1662 – 20 October 1663
Willem Volger: 20 October 1663 – 7 November 1664
Jacob Gruijs: 7 November 1664 – 27 October 1665
Willem Volger: 28 October 1665: – 27 October 1666
Daniel Six: 18 October 1666 – 6 November 1667
Constantin Ranst de Jonge: 6 November 1667 – 25 October 1668
Daniel Six [Sicx]: 25 October 1668 – 14 October 1669
François de Haze: 14 October 1669 – 2 November 1670
Martinus Caesar: 2 November 1670 – 12 November 1671
Johannes Camphuys: 22 October 1671 – 12 November 1672
Martinus Caesar: 13 November 1672 – 29 October 1673
Johannes Camphuys: 29 October 1673 – 19 October 1674
Martinus Caesar: 20 October 1674 – 7 November 1675
Johannes Camphuys: 7 November 1675 – 27 October 1676
Dirck de Haze: 27 October 1676 – 16 October 1677
Albert Breevinck: 16 October 1677 – 4 November 1678
Dirck de Haas: 4 November 1678 – 24 October 1679
Albert Breevinck: 24 October 1679 – 11 November 1680
Isaac van Schinne: 11 November 1680 – 31 October 1681
Hendrick Canzius: 31 October 1681 – 20 October 1682
Andreas Cleyer: 20 October 1682 – 8 November 1683
Constantin Ranst de Jonge: 8 November 1683 – 28 October 1684
Hendrick van Buijtenhem: 25 October 1684 – 7 October 1685
Andreas Cleyer: 17 October 1685 – 5 November 1686
Constantin Ranst de Jonge: 5 November 1686 – 25 October 1687
Hendrick van Buijtenhem: 25 October 1687 – 13 October 1688
Cornelis van Outhoorn: 13 October 1688 – 1 November 1689
Balthasar Sweers: 1 November 1689 – 21 October 1690
Hendrick van Buijtenhem: 21 October 1690 – 9 November 1691
Cornelis van Outhoorn: 9 November 1691 – 29 October 1692
Hendrick van Buijtenhem: 29 October 1692 – 19 October 1693
Gerrit de Heere: 19 October 1693: – 7 November 1694
Hendrik Dijkman: 7 November 1694 – 27 October 1695
Cornelis van Outhoorn: 27 October 1695 – 15 October 1696
Hendrik Dijkman: 15 October 1696 – 3 November 1697
Pieter de Vos: 3 November 1697 – 23 October 1698
Hendrik Dijkman: 23 October 1698 – 12 October 1699
Pieter de Vos: 21 October 1699 – 31 October 1700
Hendrik Dijkman: 31 October 1700 – 21 October 1701
Abraham Douglas: 21 October 1701 – 30 October 1702
Ferdinand de Groot: 9 November 1702 – 30 October 1703
Gideon Tant: 30 October 1703 – 18 October 1704
Ferdinand de Groot: 18 October 1704 – 6 November 1705
Ferdinand de Groot: 26 October 1706 – 15 October 1707
Hermanus Menssingh: 15 October 1707 – 2 November 1708
Jasper van Mansdale: 2 November 1708 – 22 October 1709
Hermanus Menssingh: 22 October 1709 – 10 November 1710
Nicolaas Joan van Hoorn: 10 November 1710 – 31 October 1711
Cornelis Lardijn: 31 October 1711 – 7 November 1713
Cornelis Lardijn: 7 November 1713 – 27 October 1714
Nicolaas Joan van Hoorn: 27 October 1714 -19 October 1715
Gideon Boudaen: 19 October 1715 – 3 November 1716
Joan Aouwer: 3 November 1716 – 24 October 1717
Christiaen van Vrijbergh[e]: 24 October 1717 – 13 October 1718
Joan Aouwer: 13 October 1718 – 21 October 1720
Roeloff Diodati: 21 October 1720 – 9 November 1721
Hendrik Durven: 9 November 1721 – 18 October 1723
Johannes Thedens: 18 October 1723 – 25 October 1725
Joan de Hartogh: 25 October 1725 – 15 October 1726
Pieter Boockestijn: 15 October 1726 – 3 November 1727
Abraham Minnedonk: 3 November 1727 – 20 October 1728
Pieter Boockestijn: 22 October 1728 – 12 October 1729
Abraham Minnedonk: 12 October 1729 – 31 October 1730
Pieter Boockestijn: 31 October 1730 – 7 November 1732
Hendrik van de Bel: 7 November 1732 – 27 October 1733
Rogier de Laver: 27 October 1733 – 16 October 1734
David Drinckman: 16 October 1734 – 4 November 1735
Bernardus Coop [Coopa] à Groen: 4 November 1735 – 24 October 1736
Jan van der Cruijsse: 24 October 1736 – 13 October 1737
Gerardus Bernardus Visscher: 13 October 1737 – 21 October 1739
Thomas van Rhee: 22 October 1739 – 8 November 1740
Jacob van der Waeijen: 9 November 1740 – 28 October 1741
Thomas van Rhee: 29 October 1741 – 17 October 1742
Jacob van der Waeijen: 17 October 1742 – 9 November 1743
David Brouwer: 5 November 1743 – 1 November 1744
Jacob van der Waeijen: 2 November 1744 – 28 December 1745
Jan Louis de Win: 30 December 1745 – 2 November 1746
Jacob Baelde: 3 November 1746 – 25 October 1747
Jan Louis de Win: 28 October 1747 – 11 November 1748
Jacob Baelde: 12 November 1748 – 8 December 1749
Hendrik van Homoed: 8 December 1749 – 24 December 1750
Abraham van Suchtelen: 25 December 1750 – 18 November 1751
Hendrik van Homoed: 19 November 1751 – 5 December 1752
David Boelen: 6 December 1752 – 15 October 1753
Hendrik van Homoed: 16 October 1753 – 3 November 1754
David Boelen: 4 November 1754 – 25 October 1755
Herbert Vermeulen: 25 October 1755 – 12 October 1756
David Boelen: 13 October 1756 – 31 October 1757
Herbert Vermeulen: 1 November 1757 – 11 November 1758
Johannes Reijnouts: 12 November 1758 – 11 November 1760
Marten Huijshoorn: 12 November 1760 – 30 October 1761
Johannes Reijnouts: 31 October 1761 – 2 December 1762
Fredrik Willem Wineke: 3 December 1762 – 6 November 1763
Jan Crans: 7 November 1763 – 24 October 1764
Fredrik Willem Wineke: 25 October 1764 – 7 November 1765
Jan Crans: 8 November 1765 – 31 October 1766
Herman Christiaan Kastens: 1 November 1766 – 20 October 1767
Jan Crans: 21 October 1767 – 8 November 1769
Olphert Elias: 9 November 1769 – 16 November 1770
Daniel Armenault: 17 November 1770 – 9 November 1771
Arend Willem Feith: 10 November 1771 – 3 November 1772
Daniel Armenault [Almenaault]: 4 November 1772 – 22 November 1773
Arend Willem Feith: 23 November 1773 – 10 November 1774
Daniel Armenault [Almenaault]: 11 November 1774 – 28 October 1775
Arend Willem Feith: 28 October 1775 – 22 November 1776
Hendrik Godfried Duurkoop: 23 November 1776 – 11 November 1777
Arend Willem Feith: 12 November 1777 – 28 November 1779
Isaac Titsingh: 29 November 1779 – 5 November 1780
Arend Willem Feith: 6 November 1780 – 23 November 1781
Isaac Titsingh: 24 November 1781 – 26 October 1783
Hendrik Caspar Romberg: 27 October 1783 – _ August 1784
Isaac Titsingh: _ August 1784 – 30 November 1784
Hendrik Caspar Romberg: 0 November 84 – 21 November 1785
Johan Fredrik van Rheede tot de Parkeler: 22 November 1785 – 20 November 1786
Hendrik Caspar Romberg: 21 November 1786 – 30 November 1787
Johan Frederik van Rheede tot de Parkeler: 1 December 1787 – 1 August 1789
Hendrik Casper Romberg: 1 August 1789 – 13 November 1790
Petrus Theodorus Chassé: 13 November 1790 – 13 November 1792
Gijsbert Hemmij: 13 November 1792 – 8 July 1798
Leopold Willem Ras: 8 July 1798 – 17 July 1800
Willem Wardenaar: 16 July 1800 – 14 November 1803
Hendrik Doeff: 14 November 1803 – 6 December 1817
Jan Cock Blomhoff: 6 December 1817 – 20 November 1823
: 20 November 1823 – 5 August 1826
: 4 August 1826 – 1 November 1830
: 1 November 1830 – 30 November 1834
: 1 December 1834 – 17 November 1838
Eduard Grandisson: 18 November 1838 – _ November 1842
: _ November 1842 – 31 October 1845
: 1 November 1845 – 31 October 1850
: 1 November 1850 – 31 October 1852
Janus Henricus Donker Curtius: 2 November 1852 – 28 February 1860 [Donker Curtius became the last in a long list of hardy Dutch Opperhoofden who were stationed at Dejima; and fortuitously, Curtius also became the first of many Dutch diplomatic and trade representatives in Japan during the burgeoning pre-Meiji years.]

See also
 Dutch missions to Edo
 Rangaku – Dutch studies
 The Thousand Autumns of Jacob de Zoet

References

Sources
 Blomhoff, J.C. (2000). The Court Journey to the Shogun of Japan: From a Private Account by Jan Cock Blomhoff. Amsterdam.
 Blussé, L. et al., eds. (1995–2001) The Deshima [sic] Dagregisters: Their Original Tables of Content. Leiden.
 Blussé, L. et al., eds. (2004). The Deshima Diaries Marginalia 1740–1800. Tokyo.
 Boxer. C.R. (1950). Jan Compagnie in Japan, 1600–1850: An Essay on the Cultural, Artistic, and Scientific Influence Exercised by the Hollanders in Japan from the Seventeenth to the Nineteenth Centuries. Den Haag.
 Caron, F. (1671). A True Description of the Mighty Kingdoms of Japan and Siam. London.
 Clulow, A. (2014). The Company and the Shogun: The Dutch Encounters with Tokugawa Japan. New York.
  de Winter, Michiel. (2006).  "VOC in Japan: Betrekkingen tussen Hollanders en Japanners in de Edo-periode, tussen 1602–1795" ("VOC in Japan: Relations between the Dutch and Japanese in the Edo-period, between 1602–1795").
 Doeff, H. (1633). Herinneringen uit Japan. Amsterdam. [Doeff, H. "Recollections of Japan" ]
 Edo-Tokyo Museum exhibition catalog. (2000). A Very Unique Collection of Historical Significance: The Kapitan (the Dutch Chief) Collection from the Edo Period—The Dutch Fascination with Japan. Catalog of "400th Anniversary Exhibition Regarding Relations between Japan and the Netherlands," a joint project of the Edo-Tokyo Museum, the City of Nagasaki, the National Museum of Ethnology, the National Natuurhistorisch Museum" and the National Herbarium of the Netherlands in Leiden, the Netherlands. Tokyo.
 Leguin, F. (2002). Isaac Titsingh (1745–1812): Een passie voor Japan, leven en werk van de grondlegger van de Europese Japanologie. Leiden.
 Nederland's Patriciaat, Vol. 13 (1923). Den Haag.
 Screech, Timon. (2006). Secret Memoirs of the Shoguns: Isaac Titsingh and Japan, 1779–1822. London.
 Siebold, P.F.B. v. (1897). Nippon. Würzburg e Leipzig.
 Titsingh, I. (1820). Mémoires et Anecdotes sur la Dynastie régnante des Djogouns, Souverains du Japon. Paris.
 Titsingh, I. (1822). Illustrations of Japan; consisting of Private Memoirs and Anecdotes of the reigning dynasty of The Djogouns, or Sovereigns of Japan. London.

Further reading
  - Published online on 18 October 2010

Sources and external links

 Original list of opperhoofden (in Dutch)
Dejima: The Island Comes Back to Life
A map of Deshima
At the bottom you will also find an image of Deshima
WorldStatesmen – Japan

 
Foreign relations of the Tokugawa shogunate